The Minister of State for the Treasury was a junior position in the HM Treasury, occasionally used in the British government. The title has not been used since May 2010, with some responsibilities passed to the Commercial Secretary to the Treasury and later the Minister of State for Efficiency and Transformation, a joint office with HM Treasury and the Cabinet Office.

Responsibilities
Supporting the Chancellor of the Duchy of Lancaster and the Chief Secretary to the Treasury to deliver cross-government efficiency and public sector transformation improvements including:

Public value and planning and performance
Supporting the Chancellor of the Duchy of Lancaster on cross-government functions and controls, including public bodies and Cabinet Office domestic

List of ministers

References

HM Treasury
Ministerial offices in the United Kingdom
Finance ministers of the United Kingdom
Lists of government ministers of the United Kingdom